Word War 5 is a video game developed and published by Crealude for the PC.

Gameplay
Word War 5 is an assortment of five word games. Each of these games involves creating five-letter words. Each game has five difficulty levels. These games can be played in English, Spanish, French, German, and Italian.

Development
The game was designed by Pierre Berloquin. It was published and developed by Crealude. It was distributed by Millennium Media Group.

Reception

Next Generation reviewed the game, rating it with two stars out of five, and stated that "Crealude's World War 5 is an obscure, weird, and severe edutainment misfire."

PC Gamer called the game a "brainteaser for word lovers", praising the soundtrack and stylized graphics.

Computer Games Strategy Plus found the games "simple to understand but nearly impossible to explain" and recommended it to puzzle fans.

South Florida Sun-Sentinel called it "a mixed bag of mind-benders", noting the option to play in five different languages.

References

1995 video games
Single-player video games
Windows games
Word puzzle video games